The Oril is a river in Ukraine, a left tributary of the river Dnieper. The Oril finds its source near the village of Yefremivka in Lozova Raion, Kharkiv Oblast. It flows into the Dnieper near the city Dnipro.

References 

 Географічна енциклопедія України: в 3-х томах / Редколегія: О. М. Маринич (відпов. ред.) та ін. — К.: «Українська радянська енциклопедія» імені М. П. Бажана, 1989.

Rivers of Dnipropetrovsk Oblast
Rivers of Kharkiv Oblast
Rivers of Poltava Oblast